Thitarodes dierli is a species of moth of the family Hepialidae. It was described by Pierre Viette in 1968, and is known from Nepal.

References

External links
Hepialidae genera

Moths described in 1968
Hepialidae